The Human Factor is an Armenian weekday television news broadcast and talk show, first aired in 2013 on June 10 on Armenia TV. It aims to address difficult social issues.

Links 
«Արմենիա» հեռուստաընկերության կայքում 
Հաղորդումներ 

2013 Armenian television series debuts
Armenian television talk shows
Armenia TV original programming